Jane Caroline Rebecca Parker-Smith (1950–2020) was a British classical organist. Her obituary in The Guardian said she had "a stellar international career, popular with audiences for her wide-ranging sympathies and jaw-dropping virtuosity".

Personal life and education
Jane Caroline Rebecca Smith was born on 20 May 1950 in Northampton and moved soon after to Hampshire where she was educated at Barton Peveril Grammar School in Eastleigh. She then studied at the Royal College of Music, at first taking piano, cello and harpsichord before changing to the organ. She used the name Parker-Smith professionally from her debut recital aged 20: Parker was her mother's maiden name. She studied under , organist of Westminster Cathedral, whom she "acknowledged ... as the most important musical influence of her life", and Jean Langlais in Paris.

She married John Gadney (died 2012) in 1996, and became stepmother to three children. She died on 24 June 2020.

Career
Parker-Smith performed at the BBC Proms in 1972.

Select discography
 Jane Parker-Smith at the Grand Organ of Armagh Cathedral. ASV Records.
  Louis James Alfred Lefébure-Wély. Romantische Orgelmusik. Jane Parker-Smith on the organ of St Nikolaus, Bergen-Enkheim, Frankfurt am Main. Motette-Verlag.
 Popular French Romantics Volume 1. Jane Parker-Smith on the organ of Coventry Cathedral. ASV Records.
 Popular French Romantics Volume 2. Jane Parker-Smith on the organ of Beauvais Cathedral. ASV Records.
 Saint-Saëns - Symphony No. 3 'The Organ'''. London Philharmonic Orchestra. EMI Classics.
 Widor Organ Symphonies 5 & 7. Jane Parker-Smith on the organ of St Eustache, Paris. ASV Records.
 Janacek: Glagolitic Mass & Sinfonietta. City of Birmingham Symphony Orchestra (Dirigent: Simon Rattle). EMI Classics.
 Romantic and Virtuoso Works for Organ (Vol. 1). Avie Records.
 Romantic and Virtuoso Works for Organ (Vol. 2). Avie Records.
 Romantic and Virtuoso Works for Organ (Vol. 3)''. Avie Records.

References

External links

Guardian Obit for Jane Parker-Smith  

1950 births
2020 deaths
People from Northampton
People from Eastleigh
Alumni of the Royal College of Music
20th-century organists
21st-century organists
20th-century British women musicians
21st-century British women musicians
British classical organists